Anna Korabiec (born ) is a Polish volleyball player. She is part of the Poland women's national volleyball team.

She participated in the 2014 FIVB Volleyball World Grand Prix.
On club level she played for KS Palac in 2014.

Her current rank is 2748.

References

External links
 Profile at FIVB.org
https://www.women.volleyball-movies.net/anna-korabiec-p3211/clubs

1995 births
Living people
Polish women's volleyball players
Place of birth missing (living people)